Robert Vernon Dalbec (born June 29, 1995) is an American professional baseball corner infielder for the Boston Red Sox of Major League Baseball (MLB). He played college baseball for the Arizona Wildcats of the University of Arizona.

Amateur career
Dalbec attended Legend High School in Parker, Colorado, where he played for the school's baseball team as a shortstop and a pitcher. He also played on the basketball team during two seasons. He was not selected in the Major League Baseball (MLB) draft due to his strong commitment to attend the University of Arizona. He enrolled as a general studies major.

Dalbec enrolled at Arizona to play college baseball for the Arizona Wildcats as a third baseman, first baseman, and relief pitcher. In his freshman year, he participated in the National Collegiate Athletic Association's home run derby. After his freshman season in 2014, he played collegiate summer baseball for the Orleans Firebirds of the Cape Cod Baseball League (CCBL), and participated in the league's All Star Home Run Hitting contest. As a sophomore, Dalbec hit .319/.410/.601 with 15 home runs in 213 at bats. Following his sophomore season in 2015, he returned to the Orleans Firebirds, batted .284 with 14 home runs in 33 games, and was named to the CCBL 2015 All-League team. He struggled in his junior year, but began to improve his play later in the season, as the Wildcats made the 2016 College World Series.

Professional career

Minor leagues
The Boston Red Sox selected Dalbec in the fourth round of the 2016 Major League Baseball (MLB) draft. He signed with the Red Sox, receiving a $650,000 signing bonus, and made his professional debut with the Class A Short Season Lowell Spinners, where he spent the whole season, posting a .386/.427/.674 slash line with seven home runs and 33 RBIs in 34 games.

Dalbec spent 2017 with the Greenville Drive of the Class A South Atlantic League, slashing .246/.345/.437 with 13 home runs and 39 RBIs in 78 games as well as batting .259 in seven rehab games with the GCL Red Sox after returning from a wrist injury.

In 2018, Dalbec started season with the Salem Red Sox of the Class A-Advanced Carolina League. In 100 games with Salem, he slashed .256/.372/.573 while leading the league with 26 home runs and 85 RBIs in 344 at bats. Dalbec was promoted to the Portland Sea Dogs of the Double-A Eastern League on August 3. In September, Dalbec was named both Offensive Player of the Year and Defensive Player of the Year in the 2018 Minor League Awards announced by the Red Sox. He won the Carolina League Most Valuable Player Award. After the regular season, he played for the Mesa Solar Sox of the Arizona Fall League.

In 2019, Dalbec began the season with Portland, and was promoted to the Pawtucket Red Sox of the Triple-A International League in early August. Overall during 2019, he slashed .239/.356/.460 with 27 home runs and 73 RBIs in 135 games.

Boston Red Sox
The Red Sox added Dalbec to their 40-man roster after the 2019 season. He was optioned to Pawtucket on March 8, 2020. On July 7, the team announced that he had tested positive for COVID-19; he remained asymptomatic. On August 30, Dalbec was added to Boston's active roster following the trade of Mitch Moreland. Dalbec made his MLB debut that day, against the Washington Nationals; his first major league hit was a third-inning home run off of Javy Guerra, coming in his second major league at bat. Through his first 10 major league games, Dalbec hit six home runs, including five straight games with a home run. During the shortened 2020 Red Sox season, Dalbec batted .263 with eight home runs and 16 RBIs in 23 games. Following the 2020 season, Dalbec was ranked by Baseball America as the Red Sox' number three prospect.

The Red Sox named Dalbec their starting first baseman for Opening Day in 2021. On July 29, he became the tallest player ever to make an appearance at shortstop for the Red Sox. During August, he batted .339 with seven home runs and 21 RBIs, and was named the AL Rookie of the Month. For the regular season, Dalbec played in 133 games for Boston, batting .240 with 25 home runs and 78 RBIs. He appeared in eight postseason games, batting 0-for-12 as the Red Sox advanced to the American League Championship Series.

Dalbec began 2022 as Boston's primary first baseman. Following a lack of offensive consistency at the position, the team began using outfielder Franchy Cordero at first base in May, then acquired first baseman Eric Hosmer at the trade deadline in early August. On September 4, with a .211 batting average for the season, the team optioned Dalbec to Triple-A to clear roster space for call-up Triston Casas. Dalbec was recalled to Boston on September 22, when Trevor Story was placed on the injured list. For the season, Dalbec batted .215 with 12 home runs and 39 RBIs in 117 games for Boston. In 13 games with the Triple-A Worcester Red Sox, he batted .250 with five home runs and eight RBIs.

International career
On October 10, 2019, Dalbec was selected for the United States national baseball team in the 2019 WBSC Premier 12. He was named the best first baseman in the tournament.

Personal life
Dalbec grew up in Seattle and was a fan of the Seattle Mariners, Seattle Seahawks, and Oklahoma City Thunder. He is interested in the music industry and is able to play the guitar and piano.

References

Further reading

External links

1995 births
Living people
Arizona Wildcats baseball players
Baseball pitchers
Baseball players from Colorado
Baseball players from Seattle
Boston Red Sox players
Greenville Drive players
Gulf Coast Red Sox players
Lowell Spinners players
Major League Baseball first basemen
Major League Baseball third basemen
Mesa Solar Sox players
Orleans Firebirds players
Pawtucket Red Sox players
People from Parker, Colorado
Portland Sea Dogs players
Salem Red Sox players
Worcester Red Sox players
United States national baseball team players
2019 WBSC Premier12 players